The Tsaratanan skink (Flexiseps tsaratananensis) is a species of skink endemic to Madagascar.

References

Reptiles of Madagascar
Reptiles described in 1981
Flexiseps
Taxa named by Édouard-Raoul Brygoo